Eugenio Tandonnet was a French utopian socialist, who lived in Uruguay and Brazil during longer periods. Tandonnet was a follower of Charles Fourier. In 1845 he founded Revista Socialista in Brazil.

References

Fourierists
Year of birth missing
Year of death missing
Utopian socialists